Vancouver-Quilchena is a provincial electoral district for the Legislative Assembly of British Columbia, Canada. According to the 2006 Census, this riding is the second-wealthiest in British Columbia with an average family income of $91,822, behind West Vancouver-Capilano just across the Burrard Inlet.

Geography 
The riding is bound in the north by West 16th Avenue from Imperial Drive in the west to Granville Street to the east. The eastern boundary is formed by Granville Street south until West 57th Avenue where it turns west until West Boulevard. The boundary turns south and follows West Boulevard and Angus Drive until reaching the Fraser River. The southern boundary is the Fraser River, turning north along the western boundary of Musqueam Indian Reservation #2 then east along SW Marine Drive until Camosun Street. The western boundary is formed by the border with Pacific Spirit Regional Park.

History

Members of the Legislative Assembly 
This riding has elected the following Members of Legislative Assembly:

Election results 

|}

|}

|}

|}

|}

References

External links 

BC Stats - 2001
Results of 2001 election (pdf)
2001 Expenditures (pdf)
Results of 1996 election
1996 Expenditures
Results of 1991 election
1991 Expenditures
Website of the Legislative Assembly of British Columbia

Politics of Vancouver
British Columbia provincial electoral districts
Provincial electoral districts in Greater Vancouver and the Fraser Valley